In complex analysis, an essential singularity of a function is a "severe" singularity near which the function exhibits odd behavior. 

The category essential singularity is a "left-over" or default group of isolated singularities that are especially unmanageable: by definition they fit into neither of the other two categories of singularity that may be dealt with in some manner – removable singularities and poles. In practice some include non-isolated singularities too; those do not have a residue.

Formal description
Consider an open subset  of the complex plane . The point  is called an essential singularity of the function  if the singularity is neither a pole nor a removable singularity.

Alternative descriptions

On a Riemann sphere with a point at infinity, the function  has an essential singularity at that point if and only if the  has an essential singularity at 0: i.e. neither  nor  exists.

The behavior of holomorphic functions near their essential singularities is described by the Casorati–Weierstrass theorem and by the considerably stronger Picard's great theorem. The latter says that in every neighborhood of an essential singularity , the function  takes on every complex value, except possibly one, infinitely many times. (The exception is necessary; for example, the function  never takes on the value 0.)

References

Lars V. Ahlfors; Complex Analysis, McGraw-Hill, 1979
Rajendra Kumar Jain, S. R. K. Iyengar; Advanced Engineering Mathematics. Page 920. Alpha Science International, Limited, 2004.

External links 
  An Essential Singularity by Stephen Wolfram, Wolfram Demonstrations Project.
 Essential Singularity on Planet Math

Complex analysis